The men's javelin throw event at the 2002 Asian Athletics Championships was held in Colombo, Sri Lanka on 11 August.

Results

References

2002 Asian Athletics Championships
Javelin throw at the Asian Athletics Championships